Fergusonix is a genus of moths of the family Noctuidae.

Species
 Fergusonix januaris Mustelin & Leuschner, 2000

Noctuidae